Town of Santa Anna v. Frank, 113 U.S. 339 (1885), was a case with no special finding of facts, the general finding of the issues for the plaintiff was not open to review by this court. Town of Martinton, Illinois v. Fairbanks, 112 U.S. 670; S. C. ante, 321. Questions were discussed by counsel for the defendant as to the legal authority of the town to issue the bonds referred to, fairly arose upon the first count of the declaration. But their determination could not affect the judgment, for the common counts were sufficient under the statutes of Illinois to support the judgment without reference to any question of the legal authority to issue the bonds described in the first count. Rev. St. Ill. 1870, c. 110, 58; Bond v. Dustin, 112 U.S. 604; S. C. ante, 296.

Judgment was affirmed.

See also
List of United States Supreme Court cases, volume 113

References

External links
 
 Google Books (Judgement from United States reports: Volume 113)

United States Supreme Court cases
United States Supreme Court cases of the Waite Court
1885 in United States case law